The Voice Kids is a Polish reality and  talent show that premiered on January 1, 2018, on the TVP 2 television network. The Voice Kids is a part of the internationally syndicated show The Voice and based on the reality singing competition launched in the Netherlands as The Voice Kids. The show was created by Dutch television producer John de Mol.

Format
There are four phases in the competition. Stage one is the blind auditions; stage two is the battle rounds, stage three is the sing off, and stage four is the final live performance. Contestants are aged eight to fifteen (from season 4 contestants are aged eight to fourteen).

The rules of the competition are similar to those of The Voice of Poland. During the blind auditions, each coach selects and mentors 18 contestants. In the battle stage, participants are divided into three groups and challenge participants from other teams. Each battle results in one winner, but coaches do not name a loser. Battle stage winners go to the sing-off stage where the coaches select nine finalists—three from each team. The nine finalists perform live and the winner is selected by the viewing audience using SMS voting. The winner receives a scholarship and the possibility to release a song with Universal Music Polska.
The Voice Kids is produced by Rochstar.

Selection process
For the first season, the blind auditions began August 19, 2017, and concluded on August 23, 2017. Children who auditioned were between eight and fifteen years of age.

Coaches and hosts
The primary coaches for this reality and talent show were Tomson and Baron of Afromental, Edyta Górniak, and Dawid Kwiatkowski. Górniak did not return for the second season and was replaced by Cleo. All coaches from second season returned for the third, fourth, fifth and sixth one.

Coaches timeline

Timeline of hosts

Key
 Main presenter
 Backstage presenter
 Contestant

Coaches and finalists
  Winner
  Runner-up

Season summary 
Warning: the following table presents a significant amount of different colors.

Season 1 (2018)

The first edition of The Voice Kids premiered on January 1, 2018. The judges were Edyta Górniak, Tomson and Baron, and Dawid Kwiatkowski. The show was hosted by Tomasz Kammel, Barbara Kurdej-Szatan and Adam Zdrójkowski. The winner was 13-year-old Roksana Węgiel from Team Edyta, who later won Junior Eurovision Song Contest 2018 for Poland with the song "Anyone I Want to Be".

Season 2 (2019)

The second edition of The Voice Kids premiered on January 1, 2019. The judges were Dawid Kwiatkowski, Tomson and Baron, and Cleo. The show was hosted by Tomasz Kammel, Barbara Kurdej-Szatan, and Jaś Dąbrowski. The winner was 14-year-old Anna Dąbrowska from Team Cleo.

Season 3 (2020)

The third edition of The Voice Kids premiered on January 1, 2020. All three coaches and main host from the previous season returned, whereas Ida Nowakowska joined the show as new host replacing Barbara Kurdej-Szatan. The winner was 14-year-old Marcin Maciejczak from Team Dawid.

Season 4 (2021)

The fourth edition of The Voice Kids premiered on February 27, 2021. All three coaches from the previous season returned in the new season. The show was hosted by Tomasz Kammel, Ida Nowakowska, Antoni Scardina and Oliwier Szot, replacing Jan Dąbrowski. Sara Egwu-James from Team Tomson & Baron won season 4 and later represented Poland in the Junior Eurovision Song Contest 2021 with the song "Somebody".

Season 5 (2022) 

The fifth edition of The Voice Kids premiered on February 26, 2022. All three coaches from the previous season returned in the new season. The show was hosted by Tomasz Kammel, Ida Nowakowska, Antoni Scardina and Oliwier Szot, replacing Jan Dąbrowski. The winner was Mateusz Krzykała from Team Cleo.

Season 6 (2023)  

The sixth edition of The Voice Kids is set to premiere on February 25, 2023. All three coaches from the previous season are set to return in the new season. The show will be hosted by Tomasz Kammel and Ida Nowakowska.

References

External links

 
Telewizja Polska original programming
2018 Polish television series debuts
2010s Polish television series
2020s Polish television series
Television series about children
Television series about teenagers